Phra Rod Meree is a 1981 Thai fantasy film. Directed by Sompote Sands, it is one of the most successful Thai feature films ever made in Thailand.

The story is based on The Twelve Sisters, a Thai folklore myth that originated in one of the Jataka tales. This same story was also adapted into a Thai fantasy lakhon.

Plot
Twelve girls are abandoned by their parents because they are too poor to take care of them. The twelve daughters are rescued by an ogress (yaksha) in disguise who promises to take care about them as her own daughters.

Phra Rodasan (Phra Rod), the only surviving son of the twelve sisters, goes on a quest to the ogre kingdom in order to heal his mother and his aunts' blindness. There he falls in love with the ogress' daughter, Meree.

See also
The Twelve Sisters
Nang Sib Song (lakorn)
Ka Kee

References

External links

1981 films
Thai-language films
Films directed by Sompote Sands
Thai fantasy films